, also known as Lock On in North America, is a jet fighter video game for the Super Nintendo Entertainment System. It is the follow-up to the Sega Mega Drive/Genesis-exclusive Air Diver.

Summary
After a vicious warlord threatens the nations of the world with a massive military invasion, the United Nations have recruited an experienced pilot by the name of Jake Steel in order to bring peace back to the world.

The player will participate in a variety of missions against both air and ground forces and can fly in four different aircraft (the British made Panavia Tornado ADV, the Japanese Mitsubishi F-2 fighter, the A-10 Thunderbolt II and the F-14 Tomcat). The player can use the strengths of each airplane to their advantage along with their powerful weaponry such as M61 Vulcans cannons and heat seeking missiles against enemy jet fighters, tanks and other various enemies scattered throughout each mission.

This game supports Mode 7.

A sequel Super Air Diver 2 was released exclusively in Japan for the Super Famicom.

Sequel

 is the Japan-exclusive sequel to the Super Famicom video game Super Air Diver.

The general idea of the game is that the player is launched into a 3D war zone with the task of flying a fighter jet. The player must defeat enemies with various weapons like missiles and gunfire as quickly as possible while obtaining as little damage as possible. Altitude is judged in feet while speed is judged in the plane's Mach number. The player is given the choice between two Western-made aircraft: a F-15E Strike Eagle or a Mirage 2000.

The game was also planned to be released in North America as Lock On 2, but was cancelled for unknown reasons.

Famitsu gave it 22/40.

See also
Asmik Ace

Notes

References

1993 video games
Asmik Ace Entertainment games
Combat flight simulators
Copya Systems games
Flight simulation video games
Sunsoft games
Super Nintendo Entertainment System games
Super Nintendo Entertainment System-only games
Vic Tokai games
Video games developed in Japan
Video games scored by Akihiko Mori
Single-player video games